Siuniu is a small village on the Samoan island of Upolu. It is located inland from the southeast coast of the island.

References

Populated places in Samoa